Park Yang-woo (born 20 November 1958) is a South Korean professor at Chung-Ang University's Graduate School of Art previously served as President Moon Jae-in's second Minister of Culture, Sports and Tourism from 2019 to 2021.

He was previously the deputy head of the Ministry under President Roh Moo-hyun from 2006 to 2008.

After passing the state exam in 1979, he worked as a public servant at multiple agencies from the Ministry and Ministry-run Korean Cultural Center New York to Office of the President for over 20 years before leaving the public service as the deputy head of the Ministry (then Ministry of Culture and Tourism) in 2008.

He then went back to his first alma mater, Chung-Ang University, as its professor of art management and later its vice president. He also served as the president of Korean Association Of Arts Management from 2009 to 2013.

From 2013 to 2019 he sataas s the non-executive director of the South Korean media chaebol's cultural business branch, CJ ENM.

In February 2021 Park served as the chair of the 14th session of the Intergovernmental Committee of UNESCO, one of its two governing bodies.

Park holds four degrees - a bachelor and a master's in public administration from Chung-Ang University and Seoul National University, a master's in Culture, Policy and Management from City, University of London and a doctorate in tourism science from Hanyang University.

Awards 

  Order of Service Merit by the government of South Korea (2009)
  Order of Service Merit by the government of South Korea (2000)

References 

Living people
1958 births
Seoul National University alumni
Chung-Ang University alumni
Hanyang University alumni
Alumni of City, University of London
Culture ministers of South Korea
Tourism ministers of South Korea
Sports ministers of South Korea